Rev. C. John McCloskey III (died 23 February 2023) was a Catholic priest of the Prelature of Opus Dei and member of the Priestly Society of the Holy Cross. He was the former director of the Catholic Information Center of the Archdiocese of Washington. He worked on Wall Street at Citibank and Merrill Lynch for a number of years before becoming a priest. He was ordained in 1981 by Cardinal Roger Etchegaray.

Conversions
McCloskey was known for having helped convert a number of people to Catholicism, including Newt Gingrich, Sam Brownback, Lawrence Kudlow, Robert Novak, and Bernard Nathanson, an anti-abortion activist who was converted from being a pro-choice NARAL Pro-Choice America founder in his earlier years as a doctor, where he performed abortions.

Allegation
In November, 2002, the Prelature of Opus Dei received a credible complaint from an adult woman accusing Father McCloskey of sexual misconduct while serving as the director of the Catholic Information Center (CIC) in Washington, DC. As regards Father McCloskey’s time before being at the CIC as well as afterwards, the Prelature had not received any complaints for sexual misconduct. At the time, Fr. McCloskey was suffering early stages of Alzheimer's disease which is known to have impulse control as a symptom.

Education
BA (1975) in Economics, Columbia University
seminary work, Pontifical University of the Holy Cross
Doctorate in Sacred Theology (STD), University of Navarra

Books 
 (2010) The Essential Belloc - A Prophet for Our Times,

References

External links
 John McCloskey's Popular Lifetime Reading Plan

Living people
American Roman Catholic priests
Opus Dei members
Merrill (company) people
Citigroup people
American investment bankers
Columbia College (New York) alumni
Pontifical University of the Holy Cross alumni
University of Navarra alumni
Year of birth missing (living people)